Donna Hughes may refer to:

 Donna Hughes (musician), bluegrass musician
 Donna M. Hughes (born 1954), feminist scholar and anti-prostitution and anti-trafficking activist
 Donna Rice Hughes (born 1958), former associate of US Senator Gary Hart and anti-pornography activist